A list of films produced in Italy in 1997 (see 1997 in film):

External links
Italian films of 1997 at the Internet Movie Database

1997
Italian
Films